Paracroesia abievora is a moth of the family Tortricidae. It is found in Japan and the Russian Far East.

The species has only one generation yearly, the moths flying only from late April through late May.

The larvae feed on Abies firma.

References

Moths described in 1961
Tortricini
Moths of Japan